This is a complete list of ice hockey players who were drafted in the Kontinental Hockey League Junior draft by the Barys Astana team. It includes every player who was drafted, regardless of whether they played for the team.

Draft picks

Position abbreviations: G - Goaltender, D - Defenceman, LW - Left Wing, C - Center, RW - Right Wing, F - Forward

See also
2009 KHL Junior Draft
2010 KHL Junior Draft
2011 KHL Junior Draft
2012 KHL Junior Draft
2013 KHL Junior Draft
2014 KHL Junior Draft

References
2009 KHL Junior Draft: 
2010 KHL Junior Draft: 
2011 KHL Junior Draft: 
2012 KHL Junior Draft: 
2013 KHL Junior Draft: 
2014 KHL Junior Draft: